Matthew Thomas or Matt Thomas may refer to:
 Matt Thomas (soccer) (born 1995), American soccer player
 Matt Thomas (basketball) (born 1994), American basketball player
 Matt Thomas (guitarist) (born 1986), American guitar player
 Matt Thomas (ice hockey) (born 1975), Canadian ice hockey coach
 Matthew Thomas (linebacker) (born 1995), American college football player
 Matt Thomas (rugby league) (born 1976), Welsh rugby league international
 Matt Thomas (Australian rules footballer) (born 1987)
 Matthew Thomas (musician) (born 1973), New Zealand rock bassist
 Matthew James Thomas (born 1988), British actor
 Matthew K. Thomas (born 1948), Indian Pentecostal
 Mathew T. Thomas (born 1961), Indian politician
 Matt Doll (real name Matthew Thomas, born 1969), Australian musician

See also
 
 
 Thomas Matthews (disambiguation)